The Abbé Étienne Guibourg (c. 1610 – January 1686) was a French Roman Catholic abbé and occultist who was involved in the affaire des poisons, during the reign of Louis XIV. He has been variously described as a "defrocked" or "renegade" priest, and is said to have also had a good knowledge of chemistry. He is best known for performing a series of Black Mass rituals with Catherine Monvoisin for Madame de Montespan.

Early life and ecclesiastic career
Guibourg claimed to be the illegitimate son of Henri de Montmorency.

He was the sacristan of the Saint-Marcel church at Saint-Denis which was later destroyed during the French Revolution but described as being "the most beautiful of the parish churches of the town of Saint-Denis". He was formerly the chaplain to the Comte de Montgomery.

Despite his position, he is said to have kept a long-term mistress, Jeanne Chanfrain, with whom he had several children.

Black Masses

According to later accounts, confessions and trials, Guibourg performed a series of Black Masses with Catherine Monvoisin (known as La Voisin). The most famous of these were performed for Madame de Montespan around 1672-3. Montague Summers gives an account of one such ritual:

Summers provides a further account of the incantation used by Guibourg himself:

Accounts suggest that La Voisin performed rituals with a number of priests (including at least one whose work was uncovered by Church authorities, forcing him into exile) as well as Guibourg. It is unlikely Guibourg took part in all of La Voisin's Black Masses. It is alleged, upon her arrest, investigators discovered the corpses of 2,500 infants buried in her yard, allegedly sacrificed the same way as in Guibourg's ritual. Allegedly, La Voisin had paid prostitutes for their infants for use in the rituals. Eleanor Herman, in her book Sex with Kings, claims that the police, given reports of "babies' bones", uncovered the remains of 2,500 infants in La Voisin's garden. However, Anne Somerset disputes this in her book The Affair of the Poisons and states there is no mention of the garden being searched for human remains.

Arrest and sentence
In 1680, Françoise Filastre, under interrogation in connection with the poison affair, claimed that Guibourg had performed Black Masses. Guibourg was arrested and confessed to this and to other crimes.

He was sentenced to life imprisonment and sequestration and died in prison in 1686.

In fiction
He is portrayed in a novel by Judith Merkle Riley: The Oracle Glass (1994).

He is portrayed as Father Etienne Gibbourg in the second season of the French-Canadian television series Versailles (2017) by Ned Dennehy.

References

 Hugh Noel Williams - Madame de Montespan and Louis XIV, 1910.
 Excerpts from Bastille trial records of Guibourg and LaVoisin (French and English translation)

1610 births
1686 deaths
Abbés
Prisoners and detainees of France
French people who died in prison custody
French occultists
17th-century occultists
People imprisoned by lettre de cachet
Affair of the Poisons